B. Ramya Sri is an Indian actress, director, screenwriter, producer, dancer and model, known for her works in Telugu cinema, Kannada cinema, and Tamil cinema, few Malayalam, Hindi, Bhojpuri including softcore and B movies. In 2013 she appeared in O... Malli as a tribal women for which she has garnered the state Nandi Special Jury Award.

Selected filmography

Telugu
 Babala Bagotham (2018)
 O... Malli (2015) also director
 Bommana Brothers Chandana Sisters (2008)
 Saleem (2009)
 Yamagola Malli Modalayindi (2007)
 Simhadri (2003)
 Evaru Nenu (2003)
 Vishnu (2003)
 Premalo Pavani Kalyan (2003)
 Aadi (2002)
 Tappu Chesi Pappu Koodu (2002)
 Nuvvu Nenu (2001)
 Jackpot (2001)
 Nuvvu Nenu (2001)

Kannada
 Aryabhatta

Tamil
 Suryavamsam

References

External links
 

Actresses from Visakhapatnam
Actresses in Kannada cinema
Actresses in Telugu cinema
Actresses in Tamil cinema
Actresses in Hindi cinema
Actresses in Malayalam cinema
Actresses in Bhojpuri cinema
Living people
Nandi Award winners
Indian film actresses
20th-century Indian actresses
21st-century Indian actresses
21st-century Indian film directors
Indian women film directors
Malayalam film directors
Telugu film directors
Film directors from Andhra Pradesh
Year of birth missing (living people)